The Nigerian Institute of Medical Research (NIMR) in Yaba, Lagos state, Nigeria is a medical research institute established by the Federal Government of Nigeria through the research institute establishment act of 1977, to promote National health and developments. Until the establishment of National Institute for Pharmaceutical Research and Development (NIPRID) in Abuja, it was the only institute in the country specifically dedicated for medical research.

Scientific Area of Research
NIMR focuses on scientific  area of research in Biochemistry and Nutrition, Virology Vaccinology, Immunology, Health system and policy research, Reproductive, Maternal and Childhood diseases Research, Clinical Science, Microbiology, Molecular biology  Biotechnology and public Health, with studies that focus on diseases of greatest public health importance in the country. These include:  Malaria, HIV/AIDS Tuberculosis, Hepatitis, Schistosomiasis, Helicobacter Pylori, and Typhoid.

On 18 September 2020, NIMR unveiled the first SARS-CoV-2 Isothemal Molecular Assay (SIMA) kit in Nigeria to boost COVID-19 testing capacity.

See also
Nigeria Centre for Disease Control (NCDC)
Nigerian Medical Association
Cocoa Research Institute of Nigeria (CRIN)

References

External links
 NIMR website

Medical research institutes in Nigeria
Public health organizations
Organizations based in Lagos
Yaba, Lagos